The UAAP Season 77 basketball tournaments were held in school year 2014–15. University of the East was the season host. The basketball tournaments started with a doubleheader basketball games after the opening ceremonies on July 12, 2014  at the Smart Araneta Coliseum. ABS-CBN UHF channel Sports and Action broadcast the men's tournament for the fifteenth consecutive year.

Men's tournament

Teams

Elimination round

Team standings

Match-up results

Scores

Fourth–seed playoff

Second–seed playoff

Bracket

Semifinals
In the semifinals, the higher seed has the twice-to-beat advantage, where they only have to win once, while their opponents twice, to progress.

Ateneo vs. NU
The Ateneo Blue Eagles  had the twice-to-beat advantage.

FEU vs. La Salle
The FEU Tamaraws had the twice-to-beat advantage after beating the De La Salle Green Archers in the playoff for the #2 seed, which led to a virtual best-of-three playoff series.

Finals
This was the first time since 1993 that neither Ateneo nor La Salle featured in the UAAP Finals. The attendance of the Do-or-Die Game 3 of the series was set as the all-time basketball attendance record of Smart Araneta Coliseum.

 Finals Most Valuable Player:

Awards

 Most Valuable Player: 
 Rookie of the Year: 
 Mythical Five:

Coaching changes

Broadcast notes

Television 
Simulcast over ABS-CBN Channel 2 (Game 1), ABS-CBN Sports and Action (Games 2 and 3), The Filipino Channel, and Balls HD with replays on ABS-CBN Sports and Action and Balls.

Radio 
Simulcast over DZMM Radio Patrol 630.

Women's tournament

Elimination round

Team standings

Match-up results

Scores

Bracket

Stepladder semifinals

First round

Second round
The De La Salle Lady Archers has the twice-to-beat advantage.

Finals
The NU Lady Bulldogs have the thrice-to-beat advantage, while the FEU Lady Tamaraws have the twice-to-win disadvantage.

Finals Most Valuable Player:

Awards 

 Most Valuable Player: 
 Rookie of the Year: 
 Mythical Five:

Broadcast notes

Juniors' tournament

Elimination round

Team standings

Match-up results

Scores

Second-seed playoff
The winner advances to the second round of the stepladder semifinals with the twice-to-beat advantage; the loser proceeds to the first round.

Bracket

Stepladder semifinals

First round
This is a one-game playoff.

Second round
The NU Bullpups have the twice-to-beat advantage.

Finals
The Ateneo Blue Eaglets have the thrice-to-beat advantage; the NU Bullpups can lose the series by losing twice.

Finals Most Valuable Player:

Awards

 Most Valuable Player: 
Rookie of the Year:
 Mythical Five:

Overall championship points

Seniors' division

Juniors' division

In case of a tie, the team with the higher position in any tournament is ranked higher. If both are still tied, they are listed by alphabetical order.

How rankings are determined:
 Ranks 5th to 8th determined by elimination round standings.
 Loser of the #1 vs #4 semifinal match-up is ranked 4th
 Loser of the #2 vs #3 semifinal match-up is ranked 3rd
 Loser of the finals is ranked 2nd
 Champion is ranked 1st

See also
NCAA Season 90 basketball tournaments

References

77
2014–15 in Philippine college basketball
Basket